Emert is a surname. Notable people with the surname include:

 George H. Emert (1938–2018), American academic administrator 
 Oliver Emert (1902–1975), American set decorator
 Paul Emert (1826–1867), Swiss-born American artist

See also
 Emmert

English-language surnames